Mexico participated at the 2016 Summer Paralympics in Rio de Janeiro, Brazil, from 7 to 18 September 2016. The country sent a 71-member delegation to the Games.

Disability classifications

Every participant at the Paralympics has their disability grouped into one of five disability categories; amputation, the condition may be congenital or sustained through injury or illness; cerebral palsy; wheelchair athletes, there is often overlap between this and other categories; visual impairment, including blindness; Les autres, any physical disability that does not fall strictly under one of the other categories, for example dwarfism or multiple sclerosis. Each Paralympic sport then has its own classifications, dependent upon the specific physical demands of competition. Events are given a code, made of numbers and letters, describing the type of event and classification of the athletes competing. Some sports, such as athletics, divide athletes by both the category and severity of their disabilities, other sports, for example swimming, group competitors from different categories together, the only separation being based on the severity of the disability.

Medalists

Medals by sport

Cycling 

With one pathway for qualification being one highest ranked NPCs on the UCI Para-Cycling male and female Nations Ranking Lists on 31 December 2014, Mexico qualified for the 2016 Summer Paralympics in Rio, assuming they continued to meet all other eligibility requirements.

Equestrian 
Through the Para Equestrian Individual Ranking List Allocation method, the country earned a pair of slots at the Rio Games for their two highest ranked equestrian competitors.  These slots were irrespective of class ranking.

Football 5-a-side 

Mexico national football 5-a-side football team qualified for the Rio Paralympics at the 2015 Parapan American Games after defeating Colombia in the bronze medal match in a game that went to penalty kicks.  Argentina and Brazil, who finished ahead of them, had already qualified for Rio 2016.

Group B

7th–8th place match

Judo 

With one pathway for qualification being having a top finish at the 2014 IBSA Judo World Championships, Mexico earned a qualifying spot in Rio base on the performance of Eduardo Avila Sanchez in the men's -81 kg event.  The B3 Judoka finished first in his class.

See also
Mexico at the 2016 Summer Olympics

References

Nations at the 2016 Summer Paralympics
2016
2016 in Mexican sports